The Obdach Saddle (el. 955 m.) is a high mountain pass in the Austrian Alps between the Bundesländer of Carinthia and Styria.

See also
 List of highest paved roads in Europe
 List of mountain passes

Mountain passes of the Alps
Mountain passes of Carinthia (state)
Mountain passes of Styria
Seetal Alps